Sosnovoborsky District is an administrative and municipal district (raion), one of the twenty-seven in Penza Oblast, Russia. It is located in the east of the oblast. Its administrative center is the urban locality (a work settlement) of Sosnovoborsk. Population: 17,242 (2010 Census);  The population of Sosnovoborsk accounts for 38.0% of the district's total population.

References

Notes

Sources

Districts of Penza Oblast